Johanne "Anne-Marie" Marie Quist (born 26 December 1957 in Nijmegen, Gelderland) is a former international rower from the Netherlands, who won the bronze medal in the Women's Eights at the 1984 Summer Olympics in Los Angeles, California. Her teammates were Marieke van Drogenbroek, Lynda Cornet, Greet Hellemans, Nicolette Hellemans, Harriet van Ettekoven, Martha Laurijsen, Catharina Neelissen, and Wiljon Vaandrager.

References
 Dutch Olympic Committee

1957 births
Living people
Dutch female rowers
Olympic bronze medalists for the Netherlands
Olympic medalists in rowing
Olympic rowers of the Netherlands
Sportspeople from Nijmegen
Rowers at the 1984 Summer Olympics
Medalists at the 1984 Summer Olympics
20th-century Dutch women
20th-century Dutch people
21st-century Dutch women